There are several psychological and physiological effects that cause blindness to some visual stimulus.
 Banner blindness or ad blindness, consciously or subconsciously ignoring banner-like advertisements at web pages.
 Change blindness, the inability to detect some changes in busy scenes.
 Choice blindness, a result in a perception experiment by Petter Johansson and colleagues.
 Color blindness, a color vision deficiency.
 Cortical blindness, a loss of vision caused by damage to the visual area in the brain.
 Flash blindness, a visual impairment following exposure to a light flash.
 Hysterical blindness (nowadays known as conversion disorder), the appearance of neurological symptoms without a neurological cause.
 Inattentional blindness or perceptual blindness, failing to notice some stimulus that is in plain sight.
 Motion blindness, a neuropsychological disorder causing an inability to perceive motion.

See also
 Blindness (disambiguation)

Cognitive psychology
Physiology